Schinia lynda is a moth of the family Noctuidae. It is only known from the dunes in the high desert of south-central Oregon.

The wingspan is about 25 mm. Adults are nocturnal and are on wing from May to June.

The larvae probably feed on Oenothera deltoides var. piperi.

External links
Images
A new species of Schinia Hübner, 1818 (Lepidoptera: Noctuidae) from southern Oregon

Schinia
Moths of North America
Moths described in 2002